The 2013 Pan American Aerobic Gymnastics Championships were held in Santiago, Chile, October 20–27, 2013. The competition was organized by the Chilean Gymnastics Federation, and approved by the International Gymnastics Federation.

Medalists

References

2013 in gymnastics
International gymnastics competitions hosted by Chile
2013 in Chilean sport
October 2013 sports events in South America
2013